Christa Öckl (born 30 September 1943) is a German archer. She competed in the women's individual and team events at the 1988 Summer Olympics.

References

1943 births
Living people
German female archers
Olympic archers of West Germany
Archers at the 1988 Summer Olympics
Sportspeople from Ústí nad Labem